Trebbiano d'Abruzzo  is the most important white wine grape in Abruzzo.

History
Created in 1972 as white wine DOC that covers virtually the entire Abruzzo region. This DOC has one of the highest permitted yields in all of Italy at 17.5 hl/ha. The wine is made from the Trebbiano d'Abruzzo grape (local name for Bombino bianco but may be another grape variety) and Trebbiano Toscano, which was once thought to be the same grape as Trebbiano d'Abruzzo, must account for at least 85% of the blend with Malvasia Toscano, Cococciola and Passerina permitted to make up to 15% of the blend. The wines must be aged a minimum of 5 months prior to release and attain a minimum alcohol level of at least 11.5%. Trebbiano d'Abruzzo is one of the most cultivated vines in Atri, the modern name of Hatria.

Sensory properties
Colour: Straw-yellow color.
Perfume: Aroma delicate with floral notes, peach scents
Flavour: Well-bodied wine, mineral, delicate and persistent.
Serving temperature: ambient.

References

External links

white wine grape varieties
Wine grapes of Italy
Crops originating from Europe
Italian DOC
Cuisine of Abruzzo
Wines of Abruzzo